Philip Hugh Bowen (born 1949) is a British poet, playwright, performer, teacher and biographer.  He grew up in Liverpool, where he taught from 1972 to 1979.  During the 1980s, he was a publican before becoming a full-time writer in 1992.  He lives in Cornwall and works all over the country as a performer and writer in schools.

Books

Poetry
What the night says
That Was Peter Glaze – Ure Press – 1993,
The Professor’s Boots – Westwords – 1994,
Jewels & Binoculars (Ed) – Stride 1994,
Things We Said Today (Ed) Stride -1995,
Variety’s Hammer – Stride – 1997,
Starfly – Stride – 2004,
Nowhere’s Far – New & Selected Poems 1990–2009 – Salt Publications,

As Contributor

Hepworth –Westwords – 1993,
Return to Sender – Headlock – 1994,
The Bridport Anthology – Sansom - 1995,
The Forward Anthology – Forward – 1998,
Paradise for Sale – Arts Council Collection – 1998,
Welsh Routes – Liverpool Community Spirit – 2006,
Hidden Histories – Exeter University – 2007,
You Have Been Warned – Oxford - 2008,

Prose

A Gallery to Play to – the story of the Mersey Poets – Stride – 1998, Updated and republished – Liverpool University Press - 2008.

Plays

A Handful Of Rain: New York City, Edinburgh, Swansea, New End Theatre – 1999 - 2002,
The Same Boat: Swansea, Cardiff and at the Edinburgh Fringe in 2003/4,
The Other Side of the Words: Swansea Penzance in  2004 – St Ives 2006,
Chimney Kids– (a musical for children with Paul Butler): Camborne, 2004, Swansea 2006,
Anything But Love:  New End London 2007, Swansea 2008, St Ives Festival 2009, Cheltenham Literature Festival 2010
Parlez Vous Jig Jig: Swansea, 2004, 2006, Shakespeare Link, Powys, Rosemary Branch, London 2008.
A Case of the Poet: London 2006, Hull 2007,

Other publications

Crafting Poetry – Original Writing for GCSE Readings by Phil Bowen – DMEC
The Blue Hand DVD (DMEC)
Adventures in Poetry – Radio 4 -  Tonight at Noon – Adrian Henri 2004
Centre of the Creative Universe – Liverpool & the Avant-Garde – Liverpool University Press and Tate Liverpool – 2007 . Revisiting Allen Ginsberg’s Liverpool trip in 1965….

Radio, Television and Film

Poetry Please
Write Out Loud
Something Understood
The Archive Hour
Adventures in Poetry - Radio 4
Happy Birthday Poetry - Radio 2
London Weekend TV
Laughing Gas (Andrew Lanyon Films) - Mister Aquaviva Pilot for Theta Films 2007/08

Awards

The Ralph Lewis Award 1997 (Sussex University)
The Bridport Prize 1998 Runner Up

External links
Poetry Lesson 
The Playwrights Database - Phil Bowen 
Phil Bowen: Generosity and Power in Poetry – from a talk by the poet and playwright at the fiftieth anniversary celebration at The Dylan Thomas Festival 2003 
Phil Bowen on topofthetree 

1949 births
British poets
Living people
British publicans
British male poets